The Old St. Mary's Catholic Parish House, located at 5th Ave. and Underwood St. in Bryant, South Dakota, is an American Foursquare-style house built in 1908.  It was listed on the National Register of Historic Places in 1988.

It was deemed significant as "an excellent example of the popular vernacular style now commonly called
American Foursquare."

Number of contributing buildings: 2

References

		
National Register of Historic Places in South Dakota
Buildings and structures completed in 1908
Hamlin County, South Dakota
American Foursquare architecture